Crosby Gilbert and Sullivan Society was formed in 1951 in Crosby, Liverpool.

The Committee

Committee 
The 2016/2017 committee:

Original Committee 
The 1951/1952 Foundation committee:

Productions 
NB: Due to casting issues, the production scheduled for 1965 was postponed, therefore no production took place in 1965, but the 1966 show took place in January.

References

Gilbert and Sullivan performing groups
1951 establishments in the United Kingdom
Musical groups established in 1951
British opera companies